Belogorye is a rural locality (a selo) in urban okrug Blagoveshchensk of Amur Oblast, Russia. The population was 2,795 as of 2018. There are 44 streets.

Geography 
Belogorye is located near the right bank of the Zeya River, 37 km north of Blagoveshchensk (the district's administrative centre) by road. Prizeyskaya is the nearest rural locality.

References 

Rural localities in Blagoveshchensk urban okrug
Blagoveshchensk